Mario Marcel Salas (born July 30, 1949 in San Antonio, Texas) is a civil rights leader for over 30 years, and an author and politician. His parents were an Afro-Mexican father and a mixed race mother. He graduated from Phyllis Wheatley High School, an African American segregated school, which like many black schools across the country remained segregated long after the 1954 Brown v. Board of Education decision.

Early and personal life
Soon after high school, he joined the Student Nonviolent Coordinating Committee (SNCC). He entered San Antonio College and graduated with two associate degrees, in Applied Science-Engineering Technology and Liberal Arts. He received his Bachelor of Arts degree in English from the University of Texas at San Antonio (UTSA) in 1987. He received two graduate degrees. one in Education and the other in Political Science. He is a retired Assistant Professor of Political Science, having taught Texas Politics, Federal Politics, Political History, the Politics of Mexico, African American Studies, Civil Rights, and International Conflicts. He is a current lecturer at UTSA.  He also served as a City Councilman for the City of San Antonio, and was very active in the Civil Rights Movement for many years. He is also a life time member of the San Antonio NAACP. He has authored several textbooks including, Foundation Myth in Political Thought: The Racial Moorings of Foundation Myth. Professor Salas helped to develop the first economic relationship with an African country for the City of San Antonio with Mafeking, South Africa. He championed the establishment of a Dr. Martin Luther King Jr. Texas state holiday and served as Vice-President for the Judson Independent School Board of Trustees. He is the President of San Antonio Community Radio (KROV) and is active in San Antonio Politics. He is a 300-Year Tricentennial Commissioner for the City of San Antonio and a member of the Bexar County Historical Commission. He is married to Edwina Lacy Salas and has two children, Angela and Elena and 3 grandchildren. He is considered an expert in the history of African Americans in San Antonio .

He married Edwina Lacy, of Chicago, Illinois, on July 9, 1988. They had two children, Elena Patrice and Angela Christine.

Career
Salas organized most of the Black student unions on San Antonio college campuses in 1969, and was co-founder of the Barbara Jordan Community Center in San Antonio. Along with former SNCC member Rick Greene and former Speaker of the Texas House Gib Lewis, he negotiated the Martin Luther King Jr. state holiday. 

Salas writes for several African American newspapers, and was the chief negotiator for the first cable television franchise in San Antonio.

Salas was involved in the liberation of Grenada as a supporter of the movement against Grenadian prime minister Eric Gairy in 1979. Salas has been critical of the Iraq War and has formulated a concept he calls the colonial matrix. In this theory, Salas says that Foundation Myth is what every American is raised up with and consists of half-truths, omissions, lies distortions and erasures of how the United States was formed. Racial myths are at the core of American education and serve as a mechanism to control the thought processes from birth to death, seeking to present a false narrative in history, culture, and the belief systems of individuals. He cites several examples, one being the Battle of the Alamo. In supporting Dr. Phillip Tucker's research, Salas argues that the Battle lasted only about 20 minutes and most of the Alamo defenders ran and were killed outside of the walls. Hence, the Alamo story is basically white racialized fiction. Under this theory, Salas claims that the racist colonial structures that were in place when America was settled are still operating in a "morphed form."

In addition to teaching at the University of Texas at San Antonio, as of 2017 he has been writing for the San Antonio Observer

References

External links 
 "Civil Rights Leader Speaks at MLK activities"
 A Guide to the Mario Marcel Salas Papers, University of Texas at San Antonio Libraries (UTSA Libraries) Special Collections

Activists for African-American civil rights
Living people
1949 births
People from San Antonio
Our Lady of the Lake University alumni
San Antonio City Council members
Activists from Texas
University of Texas at San Antonio alumni